Operation Hedge-hop was a military plan developed during the Korean War. A lack of UN supplies forced American forces to use P-80 high-altitude jets as low altitude strike bombers, beginning in late 1950. The innovation paid off.

Warfront #18 (1951) featured an explanation of it, as well as in Fighting Fronts #2.

A fuller version was published in War Battles as "Aces Low!".

References

External links 
 GCD :: Issue :: Warfront #18

Hedge-hop
Aerial bombing operations and battles
Aerial operations and battles of the Korean War